Chunox  is a village in the Corozal District of the nation of Belize. Chunox is located on the east bank of Laguna Seca towards the south end of the lagoon at an altitude of 3 meters above sea level. According to the 2000 census, Chunox had a population of 1,143 people.

Chunox Village is served by St. Viator Vocational High School. While the official language of Chunox is English most residents of Chunox primarily speak Spanish due that most of the inhabitants are from Maya Mestizo ancestry.

While the nearby settlement of Copper Bank—situated across the lagoon from Chunox, on the west bank—is a fishing village, Chunox is primarily agricultural, and it is surrounded by sugar cane fields.

There are several Maya residential mound groups in Chunox that appear to date from the Classic Period.

References

Populated places in Corozal District